Sinja Glava is a village in the municipality of Pirot, Serbia. According to the 2002 census, the village has a population of 138 people.

References

Populated places in Pirot District